Manphool Singh Chaudhary is an Indian politician.  He was elected to the Lok Sabha, the lower house of the Parliament of India from Bikaner, Rajasthan as a member of the Indian National Congress.

References

External links
Official biographical sketch in Parliament of India website

India MPs 1980–1984
India MPs 1984–1989
India MPs 1991–1996
Lok Sabha members from Rajasthan
Indian National Congress politicians
1927 births
People from Bikaner district
Possibly living people